Yevgeni Vladimirovich Zinovyev (born 15 June  1981) is a Russian professional football official and a former player.

Club career
He made his professional debut in the Russian Second Division in 1997 for FC Chkalovets Novosibirsk. He played one game for the main FC Lokomotiv Moscow squad in the Russian Cup.

References

External links

1981 births
Living people
Russian footballers
Association football midfielders
Russian expatriate footballers
Expatriate footballers in Belarus
Russian Premier League players
FC Sibir Novosibirsk players
FC Lokomotiv Moscow players
FC Volgar Astrakhan players
FC Gomel players
FC Baltika Kaliningrad players
Sportspeople from Novosibirsk